The Haumi River is a river of the Northland Region of New Zealand. It flows into the Bay of Islands immediately south of Paihia.

References

Far North District
Rivers of the Northland Region
Bay of Islands
Rivers of New Zealand